The 1936–37 Divizia C was the first season of the third tier league of the Romanian football league system. The league was divided in five parallel divisions, based on geographical criteria. The winner of each division earned promotion to the next season of Divizia B.

North League

Seria I

Seria II

North League Final

Tricolor Baia Mare promoted to Divizia B

South League

Seria I

Seria II

South League Final

Telefon Club București promoted to Divizia B

West League

Central League

East League

See also 
 1936–37 Divizia A
 1936–37 Divizia B

References 

Liga III seasons
3
Rom